Stade Lorrain Université Club Nancy Basket, commonly referred to as SLUC Nancy Basket, is a French professional basketball club based in Nancy. The club currently competes in the LNB Pro A, the top league in France, and holds two league titles. SLUC was also a regular member of the EuroCup competition.

History
SLUC Nancy was founded in 1967. The club won the French 2nd Division championship in 1994. The club won the French 1st Division championship in the years 2008 and 2011. They also won the French Leaders Cup title in 2005, and the French Super Cup
title in 2008 and 2011.

In pan European competition, SLUC Nancy won the European-wide 3rd-tier level league, the FIBA Korać Cup, in the 2001–02 season.

Arena
SLUC Nancy plays its home games at the 6,027 seat Palais des Sports Jean Weille.

Titles

Domestic 
LNB Pro A
 Winners (2): 2007–08, 2010–11
LNB Pro B
 Winners (2): 1993–94, 2021–22
Leaders Cup
 Winners (1): 2005
French Super Cup
 Winners (2): 2008, 2011

European 
FIBA Korać Cup
 Winners (1): 2001–02

Other competitions 
Nancy, France Basketball Tournament
 Winners (1): 2008

Logos

Players

Current roster

Notable players

  Nicolas Batum
  Hervé Dubuisson
  Joseph Gomis
  Sy Ismaïla
  Jonathan Jeanne
  Cyril Julian
  Tariq Kirksay
  Vincent Masingue
  Mickaël Piétrus
  Maxime Zianveni
  Ricardo Greer
  Pekka Markkanen
  Brandon Brown
  Tremmell Darden
  Willie Deane
  Leon Gobczynski
  Donte Grantham
  Phil Handy
  Mike James
  Derrick Lewis
  Jimmy Oliver
  Mike Scott
  Marcus Slaughter
  John Cox

Head coaches
 Hervé Dubuisson
 Grégor Beugnot

External links
 Official website 
 Sluc Nancy Basket at Eurobasket.com

Basketball teams in France
Basketball teams established in 1967